Local Testimony is a regional photojournalism exhibition for photographers from Israel and the Palestinian Authority, held every year since 2003 in the Eretz Israel Museum.

The exhibition is held alongside the World Press Photo exhibition, presenting photographs from the field of photojournalism.

Details
The photographs in the exhibition are selected by a panel of judges. Photographs are divided into several categories. Three images are selected in each category: first, second and third place. In addition to categories, Photo of the Year and Series of the Year are chosen by the jury.

One of the categories is Religion and Faith, which traditionally includes photographs reflecting life of the Jewish ultra-orthodox community.

The exhibition was established by Dana Wohlfeiler-Lalkin, who has been the manager of the project since.

Frames of reality
Local Testimony established the Frames of Reality project in 2008 in collaboration with Peres Center for Peace. The project is to bring together Israeli and Palestinian photojournalists and documentary photographers to promote coexistence and mutual understanding. The project includes workshops, meetings and lectures.

Photos of the year

References

External links

Interview of Dana Wohlfeiler-Lalkin (video)

Photography exhibitions
Photography awards
Photojournalism awards